The Restoration of Taiwan strait shipping (台湾海峡复航) was marked by the 11 hour passage of the PRC cargo ship Meishan (眉山轮) on 29 May 1979 across the Taiwan strait from Kinmen to Mazu. The PRC resumed the use of its own civilian vessels across the Taiwan strait.

See also 
 Guanbi policy
 Opening of the South-North route
 臺灣海峽中線
 M503航路事件

References 

May 1979 events in Asia
1979 in Taiwan
1979 in China
Cross-Strait relations